Group 3 was one of six groups of national teams competing in the group stage of the 1982 FIFA World Cup. Play began on 13 June with the opening match of the tournament and ended on 23 June 1982. The group consisted of four teams: The seeded team, the reigning world champions Argentina, Belgium, Hungary and El Salvador.

Belgium won the group and advanced to the second round, along with Argentina. Despite recording the biggest victory in World Cup history, Hungary failed to advance.

Standings

Matches

Argentina vs Belgium

Hungary vs El Salvador

Argentina vs Hungary

Following an officiating error, Hungary took the kick-off in both halves.

Belgium vs El Salvador

Belgium vs Hungary

Argentina vs El Salvador

References

External links
 1982 FIFA World Cup archive
 Spain 1982 FIFA Technical Report: Statistical Details of the Matches pp. 111-115

1982 FIFA World Cup
Argentina at the 1982 FIFA World Cup
Belgium at the 1982 FIFA World Cup
El Salvador at the 1982 FIFA World Cup
Hungary at the 1982 FIFA World Cup